This is a list of ministers from Pema Khandu cabinets starting from 22 December 2019. Pema Khandu is the leader of BJP, who was sworn in the Chief Minister of Arunachal Pradesh on  22 December 2019 as BJP's Chief Minister.

Chief Minister & Cabinet Ministers

Former Ministers 

 Jomde Kena - Minister of Transport, Supply and Transport, Legal Metrology and Consumer Affairs
 Rajesh Tacho - Minister of Animal Husbandry and Veterinary, Diary Development, Fisheries
 Tanga Byaling - Minister of Rural Development, Panchayat
 Takam Pario - Minister of Public Health Engineering, Disaster Management

References

Indian political people
Bharatiya Janata Party